Goretti Chadwick is a Samoan-New Zealand stage and television actress, writer, director and tutor.

Chadwick completed a Diploma in Stage and Screen Acting at Unitec Institute of Technology in Auckland, New Zealand. She has worked in theatre and television as an actor, writer and director. Her work in theatre includes Hymn, The Rocky Horror Picture Show, Island Girls and Jingle Bells. Her film credits include The Legend of Johnny Lingo, The Overstayer and Sione's Wedding. In 2010 she partnered with Anapela Polataivao to create the comedic duo Pani and Pani, and the pair went on to create and host the television show Game of Bros.

Chadwick is a tutor in acting and directing at Pacific Institute of Performing Arts (PIPA) in Auckland, New Zealand.

Stage appearances 

 Frangipani Perfume, written by Makerita Urale, Auckland, 2005
 Doubt, written by John Patrick Shanley, Auckland, 2006
 My name is Gary Cooper, written by Victor Rodger, Auckland, 2007
 Jingle Bells, written by Dianna Fuemana, Auckland, 2010
 Still Life With Chickens, written by D.F. Mamea, Auckland and national tour, 2017

Directing credits 

 Sinarella, Auckland, 2012
 Where We Once Belonged, co-directed with Anapela Polataivao, Auckland, 2012

Film appearances 

 The Overstayer, 1999
 The Legend of Johnny Lingo, 2003
 Sione's Wedding, 2006
 Apron Strings, 2008
 Vermilion, 2018

Television credits 

 Tala Pasifika, 1995 
 The Market, 2005 
 Orange Roughies, 2006-2007 
 A Thousand Apologies, 2008 
 Fresh TV, 2011 - ongoing 
 Game of Bros, 2016 - ongoing

References

Living people
Year of birth missing (living people)
21st-century New Zealand actresses
Unitec Institute of Technology alumni
Actresses of Samoan descent
New Zealand television actresses
New Zealand film actresses
New Zealand people of Samoan descent